Bernardine Dong Guangqing (April 1, 1917 – May 12, 2007) was a Catholic Patriotic Association-associated Bishop of Wuhan, China.

See also

Joseph Ma Yinglin
Joseph Liu Xinhong

Bishops of the Catholic Patriotic Association
1917 births
2007 deaths